Bandula Wijay (born, 1946 in Galle, Sri Lanka) is an American inventor, businessman, and diplomat. He also serves as a Professor of Clinical Medicine at the Kotelawala Defense University and he is appointed as an Ambassador for Science Technology and Innovation for Sri Lanka. In addition, Wijay is the current President of LeoMed LLC, a medical device company. Wijay is an expert in innovative cardiovascular.

Wijay has received Lifetime Achievement Award from Maithripala Sirisena, President of Sri Lanka in 2016; Vidya Jyothi award in 2017; and Ada Derana Sri Lankan Global Inventor  of the Year in 2018.

Early life and education 
Wijay was born in the southern city of Galle in Sri Lanka. His father, Benny Wijayarathna was a Principal and his mother Katherina Wijayarathna was the Head Mistress in a primary school. Wijay attended Mahinda College until he completed the Advanced Level examination. After finishing Advanced Level examination, Wijay attended Jadavpur University on an Indian Government Cultural scholarship, India in 1967 to complete a degree in Chemical Engineering.  In 1974, he received the Fulbright Scholarship to pursue higher studies at the University of Southern California, where he first completed a Master’s degree in Chemical Engineering and then a Master’s degree in Mechanical Engineering. Later, he completed his doctorate in Chemical Engineering from the University of Southern California.

Career 
In 1984, he started his entrepreneurial career, Wijay along with Dr. Paolo Angelini of the Texas Heart Institute, developed the angioplasty balloon catheter system along with the coronary artery perfusion pump system to be used during angioplasty.

In 1995, Bandula invented the "Nested Loop" vascular stent, used in treating stenotic arteries after balloon angioplasty.

Selected awards 
 1995: Entrepreneur of the year, by Merrill Lynch
 1998: Business Professional of the Year from the South Asian Chamber of Commerce
 2004: Lifetime Achievement Award from the Sri Lanka Foundation
 2016: Lifetime Achievement Award from Maithripala Sirisena, President of Sri Lanka
 2017: Vidya Jyothi Award
 2018: Ada Derana, Global Inventor award 
 2018: Global Citizen award from the United Nations Chapter in Houston, Texas.

Memberships and appointments 
 2012-2017: Honorary Consul of Sri Lanka in Texas by Mahinda Rajapaksa, President of Sri Lanka
 2013-2016: Visiting Instructor of Bioengineering at the University of Houston (Victoria) 
 2016-2019: Advisor, TMCX
 2016: Advisor, OPEN Entrepreneurship Network 
 2017: Honorary Professor of Clinical Medicine at the Kotelawala Defense University.
 University of Ruhuna – Advisor for Mechanical Engineering Design Examination
 2017: The Ambassador for Science, Technology, and Innovation for Sri Lanka by Maithripala Sirisena, President of Sri Lanka

References 

Vidya Jyothi
1946 births
Alumni of Mahinda College
American people of Sri Lankan descent
Honorary consuls of Sri Lanka
Jadavpur University alumni
Living people
People from Galle
Sinhalese businesspeople
University of Southern California alumni